Killer Women with Piers Morgan was a British television documentary series, broadcast on ITV and consisting of interviews by Piers Morgan with convicted American women murderers. The first series, of two episodes, was broadcast in May 2016, and the second series began its run in June 2017.

Overview
Among those interviewed in the first series was Erin Caffey, whose boyfriend Charlie Wilkinson and his friend Charles Wade shot and stabbed her mother and two brothers to death in 2008. In the second series Morgan interviewed Rebecca Fenton, who murdered her husband; and Amber Wright, who took part in the murder of her teenage boyfriend.

Episodes

Season 1
 S01E01 - Erin Caffey: Piers travels to Gatesville Texas to meet Erin Caffey who, at the age of 16, masterminded the brutal murder of her entire family.
 S01E02 - Amanda Lewis/Rhonda Glover: A mother is accused by her 7-year-old son of drowning her own daughter. Piers also talks to a beauty queen accused of killing her wealthy lover in Austin, Texas.

Season 2
 S02E01 - Rebecca Fenton: In spite of her conviction, Rebecca Fenton denies murdering her husband, Larry, on Super Bowl Sunday in 2008; Piers Morgan seeks to find out the truth.
 S02E02 - Amber Wright: Every teenager deals with the fallout from a romantic breakup, but few go to the lengths of 15-year-old Amber Wright who lured her former partner Seath Jackson to his death.
 S02E03 - Jennifer Mee: Jennifer Mee first gained fame as the " Hiccup Girl". She is now serving a life sentence even though she didn't pull the trigger and wasn't even at the scene when the bullets that killed a young man, Shannon Griffin, were fired.
 S02E04 - Ashley Humphrey: Ashley Humphrey stalked her victim Sandee Rozzo, a woman she did not even know for nearly 20 miles with murder very much on her mind. After shooting her point blank 8 times Ashley is now serving 25 years. 
 S02E05 - Sheila Davalloo: For 14 years, Sheila Davalloo has remained silent about the events surrounding the murder of Anna Lisa Raymundo. But in an exclusive first-ever interview, Piers will get the chance sit face to face with Davalloo and drill down into what really happened.

Reception

The Guardian, while judging Morgan to be a "good interviewer", doubted the real value of the series.

References

External links

2016 British television series debuts
ITV (TV network) original programming